Gastroplakaeis is a genus of moths in the family Lasiocampidae first described by Heinrich Benno Möschler in 1887.

Species
Gastroplakaeis annuligera Strand, 1913
Gastroplakaeis delicatulus Aurivillius, 1911
Gastroplakaeis elongata Hering, 1941
Gastroplakaeis forficulatus Möschler, 1887
Gastroplakaeis greyi Holland, 1893
Gastroplakaeis idakum Bethune-Baker, 1913
Gastroplakaeis meridionalis Aurivillius, 1901
Gastroplakaeis punctifera (Riel, 1911)
Gastroplakaeis rubroanalis Wichgraf, 1913
Gastroplakaeis rufescens Aurivillius, 1905
Gastroplakaeis schultzei Aurivillius, 1905
Gastroplakaeis toroensis Bethune-Baker, 1927
Gastroplakaeis variegata Hering, 1932

References
Möschler, 1887. Abhandlungen der Senckenbergische Naturforschende Gesellschaft 15(1): 79–80; pl. 1

External links
 - with images

Lasiocampinae
Moth genera